Cannae (now Canne della Battaglia) is an ancient village of the Apulia region of south east Italy. It is a frazione (civil parish) of the comune (municipality) of Barletta. Cannae was formerly a bishopric, and is presently (2022) a Latin Catholic titular see.

Geography 

History 
It is primarily known for the Battle of Cannae, in which the numerically superior Roman army suffered a disastrous defeat by Hannibal in 216 BC (see Punic Wars). There is a considerable controversy as to whether the battle took place on the right or the left bank of the river.

In later times the place became a municipium, and the remains of an unimportant Roman town still exist upon the hill known as Monte di Canne. In the Middle Ages, probably after the destruction of Canosa di Puglia in the 9th century, it became a bishopric, and again saw military action in the second battle of Cannae, twelve centuries after the more famous one (1018). The Byzantine katapan, Basilios Bojoannes, successfully drove off the invading Lombard and Norman army. The town was wrecked in 1083 by Robert Guiscard, who left only the cathedral and bishop's residence, and was ultimately destroyed in 1276.

See also 
 Battle of Cannae (216 BC)
 Battle of Cannae (1018)
 Battle of Montemaggiore
 List of Catholic dioceses in Italy

References

Bibliography 

 Berry, Small, Talbert, Elliott, Gillies, Becker, 'Cannae' in Pleiades Gazetteer: http://pleiades.stoa.org/places/442523

 Gams, Pius Bonifacius Series episcoporum Ecclesiae Catholicae, reprint: Leipzig 1931, pp. 865–866.
 
 Hammond, N.G.L. & Scullard, H.H. (Eds.) (1970). The Oxford Classical Dictionary. Oxford: Oxford University Press. . p. 201.
 Pius VII (1818), "De utiliori," in: Bullarii romani continuatio, Vol. XV, Rome 1853, pp. 56–61.

External links
 GCatholic – data on former and titular bishopric
 

Frazioni of the Province of Barletta-Andria-Trani
Barletta
Archaeological sites in Apulia